Botanisk Tidsskrift (standard abbreviation Bot. Tidsskr.) was a Danish mixed scientific and amateur journal concerning  botany, issued in Copenhagen by the Danish Botanical Society.  It was published from 1866 to 1980, when it fused with Botaniska Notiser, Friesia and Norwegian Journal of Botany to form the Nordic Journal of Botany.

Monographs were published in a parallel series, Dansk Botanisk Arkiv.

Full digital text of Botanisk Tidsskrift is available at Biodiversity Heritage Library

References

External links
 Botanisk Tidsskrift at HathiTrust Digital Library
 Botanisk Tidsskrift at Biodiversity Heritage Library
 Botanisk Tidsskrift at Botanical Scientific Journals

Magazines established in 1866
Botany journals
1866 establishments in Denmark
Magazines disestablished in 1980
Magazines published in Copenhagen
1980 disestablishments in Denmark
Defunct magazines published in Denmark
Danish-language magazines